Caladenia phaeoclavia, commonly known as the brown-clubbed spider orchid is a species of orchid endemic to New South Wales. It has a single, hairy leaf and a single light to dark green flower with red stripes and thick, brownish club-like tips on the sepals.

Description 
Caladenia phaeoclavia is a terrestrial, perennial, deciduous, herb with an underground tuber. The sepals and petals are pale to dark green with a central dark red stripe. Flowering occurs from October to November.

Taxonomy and naming 
Caladenia phaeoclavia was first described in 1999 by David Jones from a specimen collected in the Wambool Nature Reserve near Yetholme and the description was published in Australian Orchid Research. The specific epithet (phaeoclavia) is derived from the Ancient Greek word phaios meaning "brown" and the Latin word clava meaning "club" referring to the brown, club-like tips of the sepals.

Distribution and habitat 
The brown-clubbed spider orchid is found in New South Wales, south from the Bathurst district where it grows in eucalypt forest often on ridges and slopes. It probably also occurs in Victoria.

References 

phaeoclavia
Orchids of New South Wales
Endemic orchids of Australia
Plants described in 1999
Taxa named by David L. Jones (botanist)